Un Nuevo Dia is the fourth studio album and second Spanish language album by Frankie J. Released on June 13, 2006, Un Nuevo Dia spawned the hit single "Pensando En Ti".

Although only charting at #196 on the Billboard 200 chart, the album did exceptionally well on the Latin charts peaking at #9. Un Nuevo Dia has since been certified Gold.

Track listing

2006 albums
Frankie J albums
Columbia Records albums
Spanish-language albums